The 2019 Tulane Green Wave football team represented Tulane University in the 2019 NCAA Division I FBS football season. The Green Wave played their home games at Yulman Stadium in New Orleans, Louisiana, and competed in the West Division of the American Athletic Conference. They were led by fourth-year head coach Willie Fritz.

Previous season
The Green Wave finished the 2018 season 7–6, 5–3 in AAC play to finish as co-champions of the West Division. They received an invitation to the Cure Bowl where they defeated Louisiana 41–24.

Preseason

Award watch lists
Listed in the order that they were released

AAC media poll
The preseason poll was released at the 2019 AAC Media Day on July 16, 2019. The Green Wave were predicted to finish in third place in the AAC West Division.

American Champion Voting
UCF (12)
Cincinnati (8)
Memphis (6)
Houston (4)

Schedule

Schedule Source:

Roster

Game summaries

FIU

at Auburn

Missouri State

Houston

at Army

UConn

at Memphis

at Navy

Tulsa

at Temple

UCF

at SMU

vs. Southern Miss (Armed Forces Bowl)

Players drafted into the NFL

References

Tulane
Tulane Green Wave football seasons
Tulane Green Wave football